Pristimantis bicumulus is a species of frog in the family Strabomantidae.
It is endemic to Venezuela.
Its natural habitat is tropical moist montane forests.
It is threatened by habitat loss.

References

bicumulus
Endemic fauna of Venezuela
Amphibians of Venezuela
Amphibians described in 1863
Taxa named by Wilhelm Peters
Taxonomy articles created by Polbot